Brian L. Fisher (born 1964/65) is a field biologist who works on the systematics of arthropods, with a particular focus on ants. He has discovered over 1000 species, including 900 species of ants in Madagascar. He mainly conducts field work in Madagascar and Africa.

Career
After working with the Smithsonian Institution in Panama Fisher did a PhD on ant systematics at UC Davis. He is the curator and chairman of the entomology department of the California Academy of Sciences. Fisher is also the present executive director of the Bibikely Biodiversity Institute and the Madagascar Biodiversity Center.

He is known for naming Proceratium google after Google Inc.

The ant genus Fisheropone is named in his honour.

IPSIO 
In 2016, Fisher launched IPSIO (Insects and People of the Southwest Indian Ocean). IPSIO was launched to develop a team approach to solving current conservation issues.

Personal life
Fisher grew up in Normal, Illinois, and was inducted into the Pioneer Hall of Fame at Illinois State University Laboratory School.

References

External links
Antweb
Bibikely Biodiversity Institute
Video interviews by California Academy of Sciences
CV on Discoverlife.org

American entomologists
Living people
Myrmecologists
University of California, Davis alumni
21st-century American zoologists
Year of birth missing (living people)
Smithsonian Institution people
People associated with the California Academy of Sciences
American curators